Xiao Fuxing (born 1947) is a Chinese novelist.  He is now the associate editor for People's Literature.

Biography
Xiao was born in Beijing in 1947, with his ancestral home in Cangzhou, Hebei. His father was an office clerk and his family had 6 members.

When he was a junior graduate student, his composition A Portray won first prize in the Beijing Youth Session Competition.

From 1971 to 1974, during the Cultural Revolution, Xiao worked in Qixing Farm as a farmer. In 1974, Xiao returned to Beijing taught in a school. Xiao was admitted into the Central Academy of Drama in 1978 and taught there after he graduated.

In 1983, Xiao joined the China Writers Association.

From 1988 to 2000, Xiao published the novels The Puppy Love, A Female Middle School Student's Diary and The Youth Sonata.

In 2006, Xiao published his novels My Youth Memoirs.

Works

Long-gestating novels
 The Puppy Love
 A Female Middle School Student's Diary
 The Youth Sonata
 The story of Beijing

Reportage
 Talking to the Middle Student
 Writing Letters to Middle Student
 Mr.Ye
 A Small House on The Coast of Ocean
 Being The Hero
 Tongfei Sketch

Prose and essay
 My Note
 The Note of Music
 Thinking of Qin E

Awards
 The story of Beijing – Shanghai Literary Award
 The Note of Music – 1st Bing Xin Prose Prize
 A Small House on The Coast of Ocean – 2nd National Excellent Reportage Literary Award
 Being The Hero – 3rd National Excellent Reportage Literary Award
 Thinking of Qin E – 3rd Lao She Literary Prize for Prose
 Tongfei Sketch – 1st National Reportage Literary First Prize

Personal life
Xiao's son, Xiao Tie, is a member of China Writers Association, who was a Peking University student, studying in the United States.

References

1947 births
Writers from Beijing
Central Academy of Drama alumni
Living people
People's Republic of China essayists